The 1978 Stanley Cup Finals was the championship series of the National Hockey League's (NHL) 1977–78 season, and the culmination of the 1978 Stanley Cup playoffs. It was contested between the Boston Bruins and the defending champion Montreal Canadiens, making their third straight appearance in the Finals. The series was a rematch of the 1977 Stanley Cup Finals. The Canadiens won the best-of-seven series, four games to two, to win their third consecutive Stanley Cup championship. This was the last time that both the Boston Bruins and Montreal Canadiens met in the Stanley Cup Finals. The Canadiens eventually joined the Bruins in the Adams Division in 1982.

Paths to the Finals
Montreal defeated the Detroit Red Wings 4–1 and the Toronto Maple Leafs 4–0 to advance to the final.

Boston defeated the Chicago Black Hawks 4–0 and the Philadelphia Flyers 4–1 to make it to the final.

Game summaries
Defenceman Larry Robinson of Montreal led all players with 17 assists, and finished tied with teammate Guy Lafleur with 21 points, to win the Conn Smythe Trophy.

Team rosters

Boston Bruins

|}

Montreal Canadiens

|}

Stanley Cup engraving
The 1978 Stanley Cup was presented to Canadiens captain Yvan Cournoyer by NHL President John Ziegler following the Canadiens 4–1 win over the Bruins in game six.

The following Canadiens players and staff had their names engraved on the Stanley Cup

1977–78 Montreal Canadiens

See also
 1977–78 NHL season

References

 
 

Stanley Cup
Stanley Cup Finals
Boston Bruins games
Montreal Canadiens games
Stanley Cup Finals
Stanley Cup Finals
Ice hockey competitions in Montreal
Ice hockey competitions in Boston
1970s in Montreal
Stanley Cup Finals
Stanley Cup Finals